The bicinchoninic acid assay (BCA assay), also known as the Smith assay, after its inventor, Paul K. Smith at the Pierce Chemical Company, now part of Thermo Fisher Scientific, is a biochemical assay for determining the total concentration of protein in a solution (0.5 μg/mL to 1.5 mg/mL), similar to Lowry protein assay, Bradford protein assay or biuret reagent. The total protein concentration is exhibited by a color change of the sample solution from green to purple in proportion to protein concentration, which can then be measured using colorimetric techniques.

Mechanism
A stock BCA solution contains the following ingredients in a highly alkaline solution with a pH 11.25: bicinchoninic acid, sodium carbonate, sodium bicarbonate, sodium tartrate, and copper(II) sulfate pentahydrate.

The BCA assay primarily relies on two reactions. First, the peptide bonds in protein reduce Cu2+ ions from the copper(II) sulfate to Cu1+ (a temperature dependent reaction). The amount of Cu2+ reduced is proportional to the amount of protein present in the solution. Next, two molecules of bicinchoninic acid chelate with each Cu1+ ion, forming a purple-colored complex that strongly absorbs light at a wavelength of 562 nm.

The bicinchoninic acid Cu1+ complex is influenced in protein samples by the presence of cysteine/cystine, tyrosine, and tryptophan side chains. At higher temperatures (37 to 60 °C), peptide bonds assist in the formation of the reaction complex. Incubating the BCA assay at higher temperatures is recommended as a way to increase assay sensitivity while minimizing the variances caused by unequal amino acid composition.

The amount of protein present in a solution can be quantified by measuring the absorption spectra and comparing with protein solutions of known concentration.

See also
Biuret test

References

External links
 OpenWetWare
 BCA assay chemistry

Biochemistry methods
Chemical tests

de:Bicinchoninsäure